Christian Bale is an English actor who has starred in various movies. Bale's role in Empire of the Sun, as a young boy interned in China by the Japanese, received praise from most film critics. Two years later, Bale had a minor role in Henry V, a drama film based on William Shakespeare's play The Life of Henry the Fifth. It has been considered one of the best Shakespeare film adaptations ever made. In 1992, Bale starred as Jack Kelly in the Walt Disney musical drama Newsies, which was a critical and commercial failure; however, it gained a cult following. He received a role in the 1994 drama Little Women, which garnered positive reviews. Bale lent his voice for the Disney animated film Pocahontas in 1995; it received a mixed reception, but attained box office success. He starred as British journalist Arthur Stuart in the Todd Haynes-directed drama Velvet Goldmine (1998). Although critics were divided on the film, Bale's role was "eagerly anticipated". Bale portrayed Demetrius in the critically praised 1999 film A Midsummer Night's Dream, an adaptation of Shakespeare's play of the same name, directed by Michael Hoffman. The same year, he portrayed Jesus of Nazareth in the television movie Mary, Mother of Jesus.

In 2000, Bale starred in the psychological thriller American Psycho in which he played the serial killer Patrick Bateman. His portrayal received positive reviews from critics and is often considered his breakthrough role. The same year, he starred alongside Samuel L. Jackson in the critically praised action crime film Shaft. He co-starred with Nicolas Cage and Penélope Cruz in the romance drama Captain Corelli's Mandolin (2001). The film was panned by film critics, and had a poor commercial performance. For the portrayal of Trevor Reznik in the psychological thriller The Machinist (2004), he lost 63 pounds (28.5 kg). Although the film was commended by critics, it was a commercial failure. Bale starred as Batman in Batman Begins (2005), a reboot of the Batman film series directed by Christopher Nolan. His portrayal of Batman was critically acclaimed and the movie became a box office success. He subsequently lent his voice in the Batman Begins based video game with the same title. In 2006, he portrayed German-American aviator Dieter Dengler in the war drama Rescue Dawn. Despite positive reviews, the film was a box office flop. The same year, he starred in The Prestige (2006) alongside Hugh Jackman and Scarlett Johansson. It received positive reviews, and was a commercial success in the box office. Bale co-starred with Russell Crowe in the Western 3:10 to Yuma (2007), which was positively received by movie critics and performed moderately at the box office.

Bale reprised his role as Batman in the second part of Nolan's Batman film series, the sequel of 2005's Batman Begins entitled The Dark Knight (2008). After its release, the film received highly positive reviews, and is considered one of the best films of the 2000s. It grossed more than $1 billion worldwide. A year later, he starred in the fourth installment of the Terminator film series, Terminator Salvation (2009) as John Connor. The film was poorly received by most movie critics; however, it was a commercial success. The same year, Bale starred together with Johnny Depp in the critical and commercial success Public Enemies as FBI agent Melvin Purvis. He acted alongside Mark Wahlberg in the biographical sports drama The Fighter (2010) as Dicky Eklund. The film was critically acclaimed and a commercial success. The Fighter earned Bale the Academy Award for Best Supporting Actor at the 83rd Academy Awards. In 2012, Bale starred in the third, and final, installment of Nolan's Batman film trilogy entitled The Dark Knight Rises as Batman. As with its predecessors, the film received acclaim from movie critics. The Dark Knight Rises has earned more than $1 billion worldwide, thus becoming the third highest-grossing film of 2012. For his role as Michael Burry in the Adam McKay-directed biographical dramedy The Big Short, he was nominated for an Academy Award and BAFTA Award for Best Supporting Actor. He received another Oscar nomination for Best Actor for portraying Dick Cheney in McKay's Vice. He played Gorr the God Butcher, the villain in the Marvel Studios film Thor: Love and Thunder (2022).

Film

Television

Video games

References

External links 
 
 

British filmographies
Male actor filmographies